Shaw Historic District may refer to:
 Shaw Historic District, Doylestown, Pennsylvania, on the NRHP
 Shaw (Washington, D.C.) (Shaw Historic District), Washington, D.C.